Azerbaijan competed at the 2011 World Aquatics Championships in Shanghai, China between July 16 and 31, 2011.

Diving

Azerbaijan has qualified 2 athletes in diving.

Men

Open water swimming

Men

Women

Swimming

Azerbaijan qualified 3 swimmers.

Men

Women

References

Nations at the 2011 World Aquatics Championships
2011 in Azerbaijani sport
Azerbaijan at the World Aquatics Championships